Whinfell is a civil parish in South Lakeland, Cumbria, England. It does not have a parish council but a parish meeting. The parish lies north east of Kendal, between the A6 and the A685. The neighbouring parishes are Grayrigg to the east, Docker to the south, Skelsmergh to the south west, Selside and Fawcett Forest to the west, and Tebay in Eden District to the north.

In the 2001 census Whinfell had a population of 152, increasing at the 2011 census to 186.

There are nine grade II listed buildings or structures in the parish, including bridges, barns, houses and a limekiln.

History 
The name "Whinfell" means 'Gorse/whin mountain'. Whinfell was formerly a township in the parish of Kendal, in 1866 Whinfell became a civil parish in its own right. On 1 April 1986 Patton parish was merged with Whinfell.

See also

Listed buildings in Whinfell

References

External links
 Cumbria County History Trust: Whinfell (Kendal) (nb: provisional research only – see Talk page)

Civil parishes in Cumbria
South Lakeland District